The Battle of Sępopol was one of battles of the Thirteen Years' War. It took place near Sępopol (German: Schippenbeil), in September 1457, but exact date is not known.

In mid-1457, only two castles along the Pregel and Alle rivers remained in Polish hands: Wehlau and Schippenbeil. In order to regain control of this area, the Grand Master of the Teutonic Knights, Heinrich Reuss von Plauen carried out an offensive, which was coordinated with an assault of Marienburg. Polish garrisons in both castles defended their positions, awaiting the pospolite ruszenie of Polish szlachta. The Knights faced the Poles near Sepopol, defeating them, and as a result, both castles fell. Wehlau was captured by the Knights in 1460, and Schippenbeil in 1461.

1457 in Europe
Sępopol
Sepopol